China National Highway 220 runs from Binzhou, Shandong to Zhengzhou, Henan. It is 585 kilometres in length and runs southwest from Binzhou towards Zhengzhou.

Route and distance

See also
 China National Highways

External links
Official website of Ministry of Transport of PRC

220
Transport in Henan
Transport in Shandong